Fârtățești is a commune located in Vâlcea County, Oltenia, Romania. It is composed of twenty villages: Afânata, Becșani, Cățetu, Cuci, Dăncăi, Dejoi, Dozești, Fârtățești, Gârnicet, Giulești, Giuleștii de Sus, Măricești, Nisipi, Popești, Rusănești, Seciu, Șotani, Stănculești, Tanislavi and Valea Ursului.

References

Communes in Vâlcea County
Localities in Oltenia